The woman with seven sons was a Jewish martyr described in 2 Maccabees 7 and other sources, who had seven sons that were arrested (along with her) by Antiochus IV Epiphanes, who forced them to prove their respect to him by consuming pig meat. When they refused, he tortured and killed the sons one by one in front of the unflinching and stout-hearted mother. 

The story likely occurred around the beginning of the religious persecutions in 167-166 BCE. Although unnamed in 2 Maccabees, the mother is known variously as Hannah, Miriam, Solomonia, and Shmouni.

Narrative

2 Maccabees
Shortly before the revolt of Judas Maccabeus (2 Maccabees 8), Antiochus IV Epiphanes arrested a mother and her seven sons, and tried to force them to eat pork. One of the brothers said, on behalf of everyone, that even if they were all to die, they would not break the law. The angry king ordered to heat up the pans and cauldrons, and he ordered the first brother to have his tongue cut off, the skin to be removed from the head and the ends of the limbs cut off – All this was happening in front of the rest of the brothers and mother, who, in the meantime, encouraged each other to passively resist the tormentors' demands. When the first martyr was inert and still breathing, Epiphanes ordered him to be thrown into a hot frying pan. When he died, the next one was brought in and the skin was stripped from his head along with his hair. Each of the seven brothers endured the same torture. The torment of the sons was watched by their tenacious and rather stoic mother, who had lost all her sons. 

The narrator mentions that the mother "was the most remarkable of all, and deserves to be remembered with special honour. She watched her seven sons die in the space of a single day, yet she bore it bravely because she put her trust in the Lord." Each of the sons makes a speech as he dies, and the last one says that his brothers are "dead under God's covenant of everlasting life". The narrator ends by saying that the mother died, without saying whether she was executed, or died in some other way.

Talmud
The Talmud tells a similar story, but with refusal to worship an idol replacing refusal to eat pork. Tractate Gittin 57b cites Rabbi Judah saying that "this refers to the woman and her seven sons" and the unnamed king is referred to as the "Emperor" and "Caesar". The woman commits suicide in this rendition of the story: she "also went up on to a roof and threw herself down and was killed".

Other versions
Other versions of the story are found in 4 Maccabees (which suggests that the woman might have thrown herself into the flames, 17:1) and Josippon (which says she fell dead on her sons' corpses).

Names
Various sources have proposed names for this woman. In Lamentations Rabbah she is called Miriam bat Tanhum, in the Eastern Orthodox tradition she is known as Solomonia, while in the Armenian Apostolic Church she is called Shamuna, and in Syriac Christianity she is known as Shmuni. She is called "Hannah" (or "Chana") in Josippon, perhaps as a result of connecting her with Hannah in the Book of Samuel, who says that the "barren woman bears seven," (1 Samuel 2:5). Gerson Cohen notes that this occurs only in the longer Spanish version of Josippon (1510), while the shorter Mantuan version (c. 1480) continues to refer to her anonymously.

In Syriac 6 Maccabees, the sons are named Gadday, Maqqbay, Tarsay, Hebron, Hebson, Bakkos and Yonadab.

Legacy
The woman with seven sons is remembered with high regard for her religious steadfastness, teaching her sons to keep to their faith, even if it meant execution. The Maccabees story reflects a theme of the book, that "the strength of the Jews lies in the fulfillment of the practical mitzvot".

The books of Maccabees were placed in an awkward spot after the rise of Christianity and the failure of the Jewish Great Revolt and the Bar Kochba Revolt.  For the Jews, the books of Maccabees, with their emphasis on offensive armed struggle, were de-emphasized after the catastrophic death and destruction in the later revolts, and relegated to secondary canonical status.  Additionally, strains of Judaism focused on the possibility of resurrection after death tended to become Christians disproportionately.  For the Christians, the books of Maccabees stayed as part of scripture due to their place in the Septuagint, at least until the Protestant Reformation.  As such, much of medieval art and literature honoring the woman and her seven sons is Christian rather than Jewish.  However, Christians and Jews set themselves apart after the triumph of Pauline Christianity by their adherence, or lack thereof, to Jewish law.  This put the woman and her seven sons in a strange position, as they explicitly died refusing to break Jewish law that medieval European Christians considered obsolete at best and immoral at worst.  The result was literature and art that revered the martyrs, but downplayed their Jewishness.

It is probable that Hilary of Poitiers refers to this woman as a prophet. Hilary says  "For all things, as the Prophet says, were made out of nothing," and, according to Patrick Henry Reardon, he is quoting 2 Maccabees 7:28.

According to Antiochene Christian tradition, the relics of the mother and sons were interred on the site of a synagogue (later converted into a church) in the Kerateion quarter of Antioch. On the other hand, tombs believed to be those of these martyrs were discovered in San Pietro in Vincoli in 1876. An additional tomb believed to be that of the woman with her seven sons is located in the Jewish cemetery of Safed.

Holy Maccabean Martyrs

Although they are not the same as the Hasmonean rulers called Maccabees, the woman and her sons, along with the Eleazar described in 2 Maccabees 6, are known as the "Holy Machabees" or "Holy Maccabean Martyrs" in the Catholic Church and the Eastern Orthodox Church.

The Orthodox Church celebrates the Holy Maccabean Martyrs on August 1.  The Catholic Church also includes them in its official list of saints that have August 1 as their feast day. From before the time of the Tridentine Calendar, the Holy Maccabees had a commemoration in the Roman Rite liturgy within the feast of Saint Peter in Chains. This commemoration remained within the weekday liturgy when in 1960 Pope John XXIII suppressed this particular feast of Saint Peter. Nine years later, 1 August became the feast of Saint Alphonsus Maria de' Liguori and the mention of the Maccabee martyrs was omitted from the General Roman Calendar, since in its 1969 revision it no longer admitted commemorations. Since they are among the saints and martyrs recognized in the Roman Martyrology, they may be venerated by all Catholics everywhere.

According to Eastern Orthodox tradition, the sons are called Abim, Antonius, Gurias, Eleazar, Eusebonus, Alimus and Marcellus, though the names differ slightly among different authorities. They are celebrated yearly during the Honey Feast of the Saviour.

According to the Syriac Fenqitho (book of festal offices), the name of the mother is Shmooni while her sons are Habroun, Hebsoun, Bakhous, Adai, Tarsai, Maqbai and Yawnothon. 

The three Ethiopian books of Meqabyan (canonical in the Ethiopian Orthodox Church, but distinct works from the other four books of Maccabees) refer to an unrelated group of "Maccabean Martyrs," five brothers including 'Abya, Seela, and Pantos, sons of a Benjamite named Maccabeus, who were captured and martyred for leading a guerilla war against Antiochus Epiphanes.

Various mystery plays in the Middle Ages portrayed the Maccabean martyrs, and depictions of their martyrdom possibly gave rise to the term "macabre", perhaps derived from the Latin Machabaeorum.

See also
List of names for the Biblical nameless
Felicitas of Rome
Symphorosa
Danse Macabre
Justus and Pastor

Further reading

References

Talmud people
Women in the Old Testament apocrypha
Jewish martyrs
Ancient Jewish women
People in the deuterocanonical books
Books of the Maccabees
Eastern Orthodox martyrs
Maronite saints